Xerocrassa siderensis is a species of air-breathing land snail, a pulmonate gastropod mollusk in the family Geomitridae.

Distribution

This species is endemic to Greece, where it is restricted to the easternmost mountain range of Crete, commonly occurring near the eastern coast of the island.

See also
List of non-marine molluscs of Greece

References

 Bank, R. A.; Neubert, E. (2017). Checklist of the land and freshwater Gastropoda of Europe. Last update: July 16th, 2017

External links

 Maltzan, H. von. (1883). Diagnosen neuer kretischer Helices. Nachrichtsblatt der deutschen malakozoologischen Gesellschaft. 15: 102-106. Frankfurt am Main

siderensis
Molluscs of Europe
Endemic fauna of Crete
Gastropods described in 1883